The William S. Boyd School of Law is the law school of the University of Nevada, Las Vegas (UNLV) and the only law school in Nevada. It is named after William S. Boyd, a Nevada attorney and co-founder of Boyd Gaming Corporation who provided the initial funding for the school. The school opened in 1998 and graduated its first class in 2001.

The school has held American Bar Association accreditation since 2003 and joined the Association of American Law Schools in 2004.

In 2023, U.S. News & World Report ranked the law school's full-time program at No. 67 and its part-time program at No. 20 among more than 200 law schools in the United States.

History 
In 1997, then Governor Bob Miller signed into law a bill authorizing the creation of the William S. Boyd School of Law of the University of Nevada, Las Vegas (UNLV).  One year later, in 1998, the Boyd School of Law opened its doors to 140 charter class students and the school moved into its permanent facilities in August 2002.  In 2000, the school secured provisional American Bar Association (ABA) accreditation and, in February 2003, secured full ABA accreditation.  The first class graduated from the Boyd School of Law in May 2001.  In January 2004, the William S. Boyd School of Law of the University of Nevada, Las Vegas joined the Association of American Law Schools.

The current dean is Leah Chan Grinvald.

Academics
The school is also home to the Wiener-Rogers Law Library, the Saltman Center for Conflict Resolution, the Thomas & Mack Legal Clinic, the Nevada Law Journal, and the UNLV Gaming Law Journal. It awards the Juris Doctor (J.D.) degree and has a student body of approximately 350 students. It also awards dual degrees—including the Juris Doctor and Master of Business Administration (J.D./MBA), the Juris Doctor and Master of Social Work (J.D./M.S.W.), and the Juris Doctor and Doctor of Philosophy in Education (J.D./Ph.D.)—as well as a Master of Laws (LL.M.) in Gaming law and Regulation. All first-year law students are required to participate in a Community Service Program and spend substantial time providing legal information to people in the community who do not have access to lawyers. In partnership with the Legal Aid Center of Southern Nevada Pro Bono Project, law students prepare and present workshops at numerous locations in their community, on basic legal matters such as small claims court procedure, family law and divorce, bankruptcy, guardianship, and paternity/custody matters.

The law school secured its position as one of the country's top 100 law schools for the 15th consecutive year, with its Lawyering Process Program ranked first in the U.S. for the third year in a row and its Saltman Center for Conflict Resolution ranked sixth among the top dispute resolution programs, according to U.S. News & World Report Best Colleges 2021 rankings of graduate schools and specialty programs. The law school's part-time program is ranked 20th in the country.

National Jurist's PreLaw magazine gave UNLV a grade of "A−" for diversity, facilities, and value, and a grade of "A" for employment outcomes.

Law library 
The Wiener-Rogers Law Library is the largest law library in the state of Nevada, and the only law library in Nevada maintaining comprehensive collections of United States legal materials. The Wiener-Rogers Law Library also serves as a resource and archive for the entire state, providing services and making its collections accessible to researchers across disciplines and to members of the general public.

Among other things, the Law Library at UNLV provides:

 More than 580,000 titles in digital or physical formats
 Access to nearly 50 law-specific commercial online databases and more than 500 databases available through the University Libraries
 Current and historical federal legislative, judicial, and administrative materials
 Legislative, judicial, and administrative materials from all 50 states and many U.S. territories
 Jurisprudence from foreign countries; international treaties and related documents
 More than 3,000 law-related documentary films focused primarily on social justice and human rights
 Eleven special subject-specific collections highlighting strengths of the collection and faculty scholarly interests

In addition, the Law Library is a participant in the federal government and European Union depository programs.

Publications 
In 2001, the Nevada Law Journal (NLJ) published its inaugural issue.  In 2010, the UNLV Gaming Law Journal published its inaugural issue.

NLJ is a journal of legal scholarship dedicated to analyzing the law and policy implications of significant case law, legislation, administrative regulations and important legal events. The NLJ publishes at least three issues per year and includes submissions by legal practitioners, professors, and students of the William S. Boyd School of Law. Additionally, topics concerning legal symposia, surveys, and tributes to important figures of the law are included.

In 2007, the Nevada Law Journal was ranked 91st by author prominence in Law Library Journal.  Washington and Lee University School of Law currently ranks NLJ 59th among 243 flagship and general interest law reviews in the United States.

Employment
According to the Boyd School of Law's 2014 ABA-required disclosures, 84.9 percent of Boyd's Class of 2014 was employed 10 months after graduation. 71.2 percent of the class was working in full-time, long-term jobs for which bar passage is required or a J.D. is preferred.

Costs
Tuition at the Boyd School of Law for the 2022–2023 academic year is $40,900 for full-time non-Nevada residents and $28,000 for full-time Nevada residents.

References

External links
 

1998 establishments in Nevada
Buildings and structures in Paradise, Nevada
Educational institutions established in 1998
Law schools in Nevada
School of Law